Uthara Unnikrishnan (born 2004) is an Indian playback singer. In 2015, she won the National Film Award for Best Female Playback Singer at the 62nd National Film Awards for her rendition of the song "Azhagu" from the 2014 Tamil film Saivam, a family drama directed by A. L. Vijay. She received the award at the age of 10, becoming its youngest recipient.

Biography
Uthara Unnikrishnan is the daughter of Carnatic classical singer P. Unni Krishnan and Bharatanatyam dancer Priya Unnikrishnan. Her father, a recipient of multiple National Film Awards for Best Male Playback Singer, received his first award in 1995 for his debut performance of the Tamil songs "Ennavale adi ennavale" and "Uyirum neeye".

Uthara began learning Carnatic music at the age of six from Sudha Raja. She studied in Lady Andal school and APL Global school. Apart from Tamil music, she enjoys Western (classical, rock and pop) and wants to master all these genres.

Songs
"Azhagu" (Beauty) was composed by G. V. Prakash Kumar, based on raga Kanada. The song describes a child's perception of the beauty around her. The song was penned by Na. Muthukumar, who also received the National Film Award for Best Lyrics. When Uthara Unnikrishnan accompanied her mother to Carnatic singer Saindhavi's house during Golu festival, she sang a few lines. A couple of months later, Saindhavi's husband G. V. Prakash Kumar called upon Uthara to croon a solo melody for Saivam.
Uthara recorded the song for child actor Sara Arjun when she was eight years old in 2013. Apart from "Azhagu", she has sung two more Tamil songs.

While praised by most in regards towards her 2015 win of the National Film Award for Best Female Playback Singer for her rendition of the song "Azhage", singer Pradip Somasundaran criticised the jury's selection, terming the song as having been heavily modified through use of pitch correction software. Uthara later worked on Theri with G. V. Prakash Kumar in the song "Eena Meena Teeka".

References

Living people
Tamil musicians
Tamil playback singers
Indian women playback singers
2004 births
Indian child singers
Singers from Chennai
21st-century Indian singers
21st-century Indian women singers
Women musicians from Tamil Nadu
Best Female Playback Singer National Film Award winners